The Den Oever Lighthouse is a cast iron lighthouse in Den Oever, the Netherlands, on the Wadden Sea. Erected in 1885, it was originally located at the western end of the former island of Wieringen where it served as the rear light of a pair of leading lights. In 1930, when the Afsluitdijk was finished, the tower was relocated to the eastern end of Wieringen at Den Oever. While the light was first directed the Wadden Sea, it was moved southward in 1932 and turned to face the IJsselmeer. It was deactivated in 2009.

A previous lighthouse in Den Oever was established in 1918. It was moved to Zeughoek in 1930.

See also

 List of lighthouses in the Netherlands
 Penn & Bauduin, The fabricators/constructors of the lighthouse

References

Lighthouses completed in 1884
Lighthouses in North Holland
Rijksmonuments in North Holland
Hollands Kroon